The New Apostolic Reformation (NAR) is a movement which seeks to establish a fifth branch within Christendom distinct from Catholicism, Protestantism (which includes classical forms of Pentecostalism, the Charismatic movement, and Evangelicalism), Oriental Orthodoxy, the Church of the East, and Eastern Orthodoxy. The movement largely consists of churches nominally or formerly associated with Pentecostal denominations and  Charismatic movements but have diverged from traditional or classical Pentecostal and Charismatic theology in that it advocates for the restoration of the lost offices of church governance, namely the offices of prophet and apostle.

Beliefs
The New Apostolic Reformation is a title originally used by C. Peter Wagner to describe a movement within Pentecostal and charismatic churches. The title New Apostolic Reformation is descriptive of a theological movement and is not an organization and therefore does not have formal membership. Among those in the movement that inspired the title NAR, there is a wide range of variance on specific beliefs. Those within the movement hold to their denominational interpretations of the ongoing ministry of the Holy Spirit within each believer. Unlike some parts of Protestant Christianity, these include the direct revelation of Christ to each believer, prophecy, and the performance of miracles such as healing. This movement has also been given the descriptive title "Third Wave of the Holy Spirit".

Although the movement regards the church as the true body of saved believers, as does most of evangelical Protestantism, it differs from the broader Protestant tradition in its view on the nature of church leadership, specifically the doctrine of "five-fold ministry", which is based upon a non-traditional interpretation of Ephesians 4:11, the so called-"apostles and prophets," evangelists, pastors (also referred to as the shepherds), and teachers.

Wagner listed the differences between the NAR and other Protestant denominations as follows  (these differences stated directly below also diverge from traditional Pentecostalism).

 Apostolic governance – Using the Apostle Paul as an example to say that Jesus appoints apostles within his church up to this day.
 The office of the prophet – Saying there is within the church a role and function for present-day "prophets".
Dominionism – Dominion theology (also known as dominionism) is based on the idea that the world has been under the influence of Satan since the fall of man and that it is Christians who have the authority as well as the duty to reclaim it for God, as an interpretation of the Lord's Prayer, "Your kingdom come, Your will be done on earth as it is in heaven".
 Theocracy – Though similar in intent and purpose, not to be confused with theocratic government but rather the goal to have "kingdom-minded people" in all areas of society. There are seven areas identified specifically: religion, family, education, government, media, arts & entertainment, and business.
 Relational structures – church governance has no formal structure but rather is by relational and voluntary alignment to apostles.

C. Peter Wagner wrote that most of the churches in this movement have active ministries of spiritual warfare.  In an article responding to criticism of the NAR, Wagner noted that those who affiliate themselves with the movement believe the Apostles’ Creed and all the orthodoxy of Christian doctrine.

Similarities with traditional Pentecostalism:

 Supernatural signs and wonders – Signs and wonders such as healing, demonic deliverance, and confirmed prophecies accompany the move of God. 
 Supernatural Revelations – There is available to all believers the ability to hear from God. "The one major rule governing any new revelation from God is that it cannot contradict what has already been written in the Bible. It may supplement it, however."

History
The origins of the new apostolic reform are associated with the Pentecostal movement of the 1900s and with the Charismatic Christianity movements of the 1960s and 1980s.

In 1996, the American theologian C. Peter Wagner organized a convention with 500 evangelical leaders, the National Symposium on the Postdenominational Church, including the organization of the church and evangelization, at the Fuller Theological Seminary  of Pasadena in the United States. Since this convention, the term has been used more and more in churches.

Members
Though few, if any, organizations publicly espouse connection to the NAR, a movement known for dominion theology and a belief in the continuing ministries of apostles and prophets alongside those of evangelists, pastors, and teachers, (Ephesians 4:11-13) there are several individuals often associated with this movement including:
 Lou Engle, founder of TheCall
Bill Johnson, senior leader of Bethel Church
 Guillermo Maldonado, co-founder and senior pastor of El Rey Jesús 
 Rick Joyner, founder of MorningStar Ministries
 John P. Kelly, founder of John P. Kelly Ministries and Convening Apostle
 C. Peter Wagner, founder of Global Harvest Ministries 
 Ché Ahn, Harvest International Ministries
 Todd White, Lifestyle Christianity
 Randy Clark, Global Awakening
Kenneth Copeland, Kenneth Copeland Ministries
Rodney Howard-Browne, Revival Ministries International

C. Peter Wagner of Global Harvest Ministries considered the year 2001 to be the beginning of the second apostolic age, for the movement holds that the lost offices of prophet and apostle were restored in that year.

After being named as part of the NAR, and critics believing that Bethel Church was instrumental in leading some Christians to embrace tenets of NAR, Pastor Johnson of Bethel became regularly listed as an NAR leader. Johnson admitting that he does believe in the apostolic and prophetic ministries, he denied however in an official statement that his church had any official ties to the NAR."

When Rick Joyner of the MorningStar Ministries was listed, he announced that "there will likewise be a horde of false apostles released" continuing: "Our team received two very specific dreams warning about false 'apostolic movements' that were built more on organization than relationship. The dreams indicated that these were trying to bring forth apostles that were really more like corporate CEOs, and the movement that they led had the potential to do great damage to the church. The enemy's intent with this false apostolic movement was to have the church develop a deep revulsion to anything that was called apostolic."

Controversy and criticism 
Forrest Wilder, an environmental-issues writer for the Texas Observer, describes the New Apostolic Reformation as having "taken Pentecostalism, with its emphasis on ecstatic worship and the supernatural, and given it an adrenaline shot." Wilder adds that beliefs of people associated with the movement "can tend toward the bizarre" and that it has "taken biblical literalism to an extreme."

Al Jazeera called the NAR "America's Own Taliban" in an article highlighting NAR's dominionism as bearing resemblance to Islamic extremism as seen in groups such as the Taliban because of the NAR's language concerning spiritual warfare.

National Public Radio brought the discussion about the political influence of the NAR to a national audience with a 2011 article. Lou Engle and Don Finto, who are considered to be leaders within the NAR, participated in a prayer event called "The Response" hosted by Texan governor Rick Perry, on August 6, 2011, in Houston, Texas. This event is cited as a sign of the influence of NAR beliefs on Rick Perry's political viewpoints.

The Passion Translation has been identified by researchers of the NAR movement as containing "completely reworded verses, making it appear that the Bible supports NAR teachings."

See also
 Apostolic-Prophetic Movement
 Book of Revelation
 Eschatology
 Third Wave of the Holy Spirit
 Christian nationalism
 Christian fascism

References

Further reading
 Churchquake: The Explosive Dynamics of the New Apostolic Revolution 
 The New Apostolic Churches 
 The Apostolic Revelation – The Reformation of the Church 
 God's Super-Apostles: Encountering the Worldwide Prophets and Apostles Movement 
 A New Apostolic Reformation?: A Biblical Response to a Worldwide Movement 
 The New Apostolic Reformation: History of a Modern Charismatic Movement

External links
 NAR Connections
 The Call Official website
 El Rey Jesús Official website
 Wagner University
 International Coalition of Apostles
 International Coalition of Apostolic Leaders
 European Coalition of Apostolic Leaders
 What does Mike Bickle and the International House of Prayer believe about NAR?

Charismatic and Pentecostal Christianity
Pentecostalism in the United States